Stanley Tancred (1912-1989) was an Australian rugby league footballer who played in the 1930s.

Playing career
He won a premiership with them when Wests won the 1934 Grand Final. Tancred also represented New South Wales City Firsts on two occasions in 1933 and 1934.

Death
Tancred died on 6 August 1989, aged 78.

References

1912 births
1989 deaths
Western Suburbs Magpies players
Australian rugby league players
City New South Wales rugby league team players
Rugby league centres
Date of birth missing
Rugby league players from Sydney